Carl Cook (born November 10, 1962) is an American billionaire businessman. He is CEO of the Cook Group, a medical device company that was co-founded by his parents. As of May 2021, his net worth is estimated to be $12.5 billion.

Early life
He is the son of William Cook (died 2011) and Gayle Cook, who co-founded the Cook Group.

He has a bachelor's degree in engineering from Purdue University, and an MBA from the University of Iowa.

Career
After graduation, Cook traveled to France and Germany for a year, setting up computers for his family's company, the Cook Group, a medical devices company founded by his late father William Cook. He then worked at the Cook Group pacemaker division in Leechburg, Pennsylvania, and in their Winston-Salem plant.

Cook is also the president of a life sciences division of Cook Group, called Cook MyoSite, which is developing a cell therapy to treat urinary incontinence.

Personal life
On January 5, 2008, Cook married Marcy Heshelman at the West Baden Springs Hotel, having met her when she was working in Cook Inc's auditing department. She grew up in Greene County, Indiana. They live in Bloomington, Indiana, and have a daughter.

References 

1962 births
Living people
American billionaires
University of Iowa alumni
20th-century American businesspeople
Purdue University College of Agriculture alumni